Razvlecheniye (Amusement) was a Russian illustrated weekly magazine published in Moscow in 1859–1916. Launched and (up until 1881) edited by Fyodor Miller, it specialized in humour and caricatures, but also contained a large and popular literary section. Among its regular contributors were Boris Almazov, Vladimir Dal, Alexander Levitov, Dmitry Minayev, and (caricaturist) Lavr Belyankin. Three Anton Chekhov's early stories first appeared in Razvlecheniye in 1883–1884.

References

1859 establishments in the Russian Empire
Defunct literary magazines published in Europe
Defunct magazines published in Russia
Magazines established in 1859
Magazines disestablished in 1916
Magazines published in Moscow
Russian-language magazines
Literary magazines published in Russia
Weekly magazines published in Russia